The Grand Duchy of Baden was an independent state in what is now southwestern Germany until the creation of the German Empire in 1871. It had its own state-owned railway company, the Grand Duchy of Baden State Railways (Großherzoglich Badische Staatseisenbahnen or G.Bad.St.E.), which was founded in 1840.

History

Foundation 

Baden was the second German state after the Duchy of Brunswick to build and operate railways at state expense. In 1833 a proposal for the construction of a railway from Mannheim to Basle was put forward for the first time by Mannheim businessman, Ludwig Newhouse, but initially received no support from the Baden state government. Other proposals too by, for example Friedrich List, were unsuccessful at first. Not until the foundation of a railway company in the neighbouring French province of Alsace, for the construction of a  line from Basle to Strasbourg in 1837, did any serious planning begin for the building of a railway in Baden in order to avoid the loss of trade routes to Alsace. At an extraordinary meeting of the state parliament, the Baden legislature passed three laws on 29 March 1838 for the construction of the first route between Mannheim and the Swiss border at Basle, as well as a stub line to Baden-Baden and a branch to Strasbourg. The construction of the railway line was to be funded by the state, something that had been championed especially by Karl Friedrich Nebenius. In September 1838 work started.

The Ministry of the Interior was responsible for the construction of the railway, setting up for that purpose its own authority, the 'Railway Construction Division'. Later the  railway construction authorities were incorporated into the 'Water and Road Construction Division'. Responsibility for the operation of the railway was, by contrast, given to the Foreign Ministry because it took over the running of the Postal Division, that from then on became the 'Post and Railway Division'. Not until the merger of the Baden Post Office into the Reichspost in 1872 did a separate railway administration emerge in Baden: the Grand Duchy of Baden State Railways.

Development of the main lines 
The first route, called the Baden Mainline (Badische Hauptbahn), was built in sections between 1840 and 1863. The first, 18.5 km long, section between Mannheim and Heidelberg was taken into service on 12 September 1840. Other sections followed: to Karlsruhe in 1843, Offenburg in 1844, Freiburg im Breisgau in 1845, Schliengen in 1847, Efringen-Kirchen in 1848 and Haltingen in 1851. The branches to Kehl and Baden-Baden were opened as early as 1844 and 1845 respectively. The extension of the main line through Basle territory required negotiations with the Swiss Confederation, during which differences of opinion over the best place for the junction of the Baden line to the Swiss network – Basle or Waldshut – led to delays.

In the state treaty of 27 July 1852 an accommodation was reached which enabled the construction and operation of a line on Swiss sovereign territory by the Baden State Railways.

After it turned out that all her neighbouring states had opted for  rail, the Baden State Railways rebuilt all their existing routes and rolling stock to standard gauge within just one year during 1854/55.

The line reached Basle in 1855, Waldshut in 1856 and Konstanz in 1863. With that the 414.3 km long Baden main line was completed.
After the all-important north–south axis as well as links to the Lake Constance region had been established by the Baden Mainline, the remaining network expansion plans concentrated on opening up the area of Pforzheim with the Karlsruhe–Pforzheim–Mühlacker route (opened 1859–1863), linking up the  Odenwald and Tauberfrankens with the Baden Odenwald Railway (Heidelberg–Mosbach–Würzburg, opened 1862–1866) and forging a direct link from Karlsruhe to Konstanz, without the diversion via Basle, in the shape of the Black Forest Railway (opened 1866–1873).

Links to neighbouring states 
Even when the Baden Mainline was being built, plans were already being  formulated to link up with the Swiss railway network. This was not achieved until the bridge at Waldshut over the river Rhine, built by Robert Gerwig, was completed on 18 August 1859. Other links were made in 1863 at Schaffhausen, in 1871 at Konstanz and in 1875 at Singen. The Basle link line, which connected Baden station on the east of the Rhine with the Central station west of the Rhine, was opened in 1873. Today it is the most important railway connexion between Germany and Switzerland.

The connexion to the north towards Weinheim-Darmstadt–Frankfurt (Main) had been established since 1846 by the Main-Neckar Line, in which the Grand Duchy of Baden participated. In 1879 the Ried Railway (Riedbahn) followed, although Baden did not own any section of it.

From 1861 there had also been a direct route to France after the completion of the Rhine bridge between Kehl and Strasbourg. The opening up of the Palatinate (Pfalz) was first realised in 1865 with a pontoon bridge from Karlsruhe–Maxau as well as a link between Mannheim and Ludwigshafen in 1867. A connexion with Bavaria followed the opening of the Baden Odenwald Railway (Baden Odenwaldbahn) in 1866.

Negotiations for a route to Württemberg were particularly difficult because both states were competing for traffic between Germany and the Alpine passes. While Baden favoured a line via Pforzheim, Württemberg was interested in a more direct connexion at Bruchsal. An agreement was finally reached in the state treaty of the 4  December 1850, whereby Württemberg was granted the right to build the direct Stuttgart–Mühlacker–Bretten–Bruchsal route (Württemberg Western Railway) even on Baden territory, while Baden was permitted to build and operate the Karlsruhe–Mühlacker line, which ran partly in Württemberg. The connexion with Bruchsal was taken into service in 1853.

Further expansion 

The subsequent expansion of Baden's railway network was either aimed at opening up the regions or carried out from a military perspective. Worth mentioning are:
 The Neckar Valley Railway (Neckartalbahn), Neckargemünd–Eberbach–Jagstfeld, opened in 1879
 The Höllental Railway (Höllentalbahn), Freiburg im Breisgau–Neustadt (Schwarzwald), opened in 1887
 The strategic diversions on the Upper Rhine: Weil am Rhein–Lörrach, Wehra Valley Railway (Wehratalbahn) and the completion of the Wutach Valley Railway (Wutachtalbahn) all between 1887 and 1890
 The strategic Rhine Railway, Mannheim–Graben-Neudorf–Karlsruhe–Rastatt–Roeschwoog (Elsass), opened in 1895

Around 1895, Baden's railway network was more or less finished bar a few small sections. In 1900 it had a track length of 1996 km, of which 1521 km was owned by the State Railways. In the succeeding years the main effort was the expansion of stations which formed railway hubs. The most important conversions were:
 New marshalling yard at Karlsruhe, 1895
 New station at Rastatt, 1895
 New goods relief line at Freiburg im Breisgau, 1905
 New goods station at Basle, 1905
 New goods relief line at Bruchsal, 1906
 New marshalling yard in Mannheim, 1906–1907
 New station at Offenburg with a marshalling yard, 1911
 New Baden station in Basle with new adjoining marshalling yard to the north at Weil am Rhein, 1913
 New central station at Karlsruhe, 1913
 New marshalling yard and goods station at Heidelberg, 1914
The newly built Heidelberg central station could not be completed due to the start of the  First World War. Its completion had to be delayed until 1955.

State-run private railways 
Several routes in Baden were built by private concerns, but operated by the State Railways and, in most cases, subsequently taken over. These were not just branch lines of purely local significance like the Wiese Valley Railway (Wiesentalbahn) (Basle–Schopfheim–Zell im Wiesental), opened in 1862, but also main lines. In addition to attempts by towns, that still had no railway connexion and wanted better access to the railway network, the large cities in the state also got involved in railway line construction, in order to open up their environs and to strengthen their position as transport hubs. For example, the city of Mannheim built a direct railway line to Karlsruhe without having to go via Heidelberg, in order to step out of the shadows into which they had fallen when the Badische Haupt Railway was married up at Friedrichsfeld and Heidelberg with the Main-Neckar Line that ran on northwards. In a countermove the city of Heidelberg pressed for the construction of the Heidelberg–Schwetzingen–Speyer route, in order to secure its importance as a transport hub.

The most important of the privately built lines operated by the State Railways were:
 The Maxau Railway (Maxaubahn) at Karlsruhe an den Rhein, built by the city of Karlsruhe, opened in 1862, was the first link between Baden's railways and those of the Palatinate. It was nationalised in 1906.
 The Rhine Railway (Rheinbahn) Mannheim–Schwetzingen–Graben-Neudorf–Eggenstein–Karlsruhe, built by the city of  Mannheim, opened in 1870 and taken over by the Baden State Railways on the day it opened.
 The Kraichgau Railway (Kraichgaubahn) Karlsruhe–Bretten–Eppingen with its extension to Heilbronn, built by the city of Karlsruhe, opened in 1879 and taken over by the Baden State Railways on the day it opened.

Merger into the Reichsbahn 

On the formation of the Deutsche Reichsbahn on 1 April 1920 the Baden State Railways were merged into it. The head office in Karlsruhe became the Karlsruhe Reichsbahn Division. The foundation of the Reichsbahn meant that a wish list of routes in Baden was cancelled and only four new lines were built:
 The extension of the Rench Valley Railway (Renchtalbahn) to Bad Peterstal in 1926 and Bad Griesbach in 1933
 The Three Lakes Line Titisee–Seebrugg in 1926
 The gap in Murg Valley Railway (Murgtalbahn) in 1928
 The Neckarsteinach–Schönau (Odenwald) stub line in 1928
Construction work on a railway connexion from Bretten to Kürnbach (with a planned junction to the Zabergäu Railway (Zabergäubahn) at Leonbronn) was begun, but the line was never completed.

Electric operations 
The Baden State Railways began electric railway operations on 13 September 1913 with opening of the 15 KV AC, 16 Hz Wiese Valley Railway, Basel–Zell im Wiesental, and on its Schopfheim–Bad Säckingen branch. In addition to an experimental Class A¹ locomotive, eleven Class A² and A³ (DRG Class E 61) electric locomotives were procured. All had side-rods driving three axles. The electrification of the Wiesen valley line was mainly done in order to trial electric traction; it had no great significance in terms of traffic. No further expansion of electric services was carried out after the First World War due to the serious economic situation and it was not until 1952 that the electrification of Baden's railway network was begun in earnest.

The network 

The railway lines in Baden State Railway network were opened as follows:

On the cross-border lines marked with ¹ only the section as far as the border belonged to the Baden State Railways. The Basle link line was built by the Swiss Central Railway and co-financed by the Baden State Railway. The state railway had a special role for the only narrow gauge line, from Mosbach–Mudau, that opened on 3 June 1905. The firm of Vering & Waechter were contracted to build and run this line.

State-operated private lines:

Apart from the Ettlingen West–Ettlingen Stadt line, taken over by the B.L.E.A.G. (Baden Branch Lines) on 1 January 1899, all state-operated private lines went into state ownership over the course of time. In addition to those lines run by the Baden State Railways there were also fully private lines after 1889 that are not listed.

The Deutsche Reichs Railway completed the following routes within the Baden railway network by 1945:

In addition several routes were built by foreign state railways that ran through Baden territory. The section from Bretten to Bruchsal was transferred in 1878 to the ownership of the Baden State Railways.

Running and rolling stock 

The first two steam locomotives for the Baden State Railways were built by the English locomotive works of Sharp, Roberts and Company and delivered in 1839. They were given the names Löwe and Greif (Lion and Griffin). As the railway network expanded the size of the fleet grew rapidly. When the railways were converted from broad to standard gauge in 1854/55, there were already 66 locomotives, 65 tenders and 1,133 wagons in the fleet. At the end of the First World War the vehicle inventory included 915 locomotives, 27,600 goods wagons and 2,500 passenger coaches, of which 106 locomotives, 7,307 goods wagons and 400 passenger coaches had to be given to the victorious powers as reparations in accordance with the Versailles Treaty. An overview of Baden's locomotive classes may be found in the List of Baden locomotives and railbuses.

The Baden State Railways fostered  the growth of an indigenous railway vehicle industry in Baden, because they preferred to buy from local firms such as the engineering works of Kessler and Martiensen in Karlsruhe, which later became the Maschinengesellschaft Karlsruhe ('Karlsruhe Engineering Company'). And two coach manufacturers emerged in Baden in the shape of Waggonfabrik Fuchs founded in Heidelberg in 1862 and Waggonfabrik Rastatt in 1897. Some coaches were also purchased by the Swiss Industrial Company.

See also 
 List of Baden locomotives and railbuses
 Grand Duchy of Baden

References

External links 
Laws and state treaties concerned with the Baden railways
Vehicles of the Baden state railways

 
History of Baden
Transport in Baden-Württemberg
Railway companies established in 1841
Railway companies disestablished in 1871
Grand Duchy of Baden
1841 establishments in Germany